Nagakawa (written: 永川 lit. "long river") is a Japanese surname. Notable people with the surname include:

, Japanese darts player
, Japanese baseball player
, Japanese translator and writer

Japanese-language surnames